Cricket centre is the headquarters–office of Board of Control for Cricket in India (BCCI), situated in Churchgate area of Mumbai, Maharashtra.

History 
The office used to be at a room in Brabourne Stadium of Cricket Club of India (CCI).

During president N. Srinivasan's tenure, he tried to move Cricket centre from Mumbai to Chennai, his home city, but board members opposed this idea. In 2007, BCCI moved its headquarters from Brabourne Stadium to the premises of the Mumbai Cricket Association (MCA) at the Wankhede Stadium.

In 2018, acting president CK Khanna proposed moving the Cricket Centre to 40 acres of newly purchased land by BCCI in Bangalore. However, the proposal received a mixed response from various state associations, with the MCA and the Saurashtra Cricket Association (SCA) staunchly opposed, the Hyderabad Cricket Association (HCA) in favour and Tamil Nadu Cricket Association, Madhya Pradesh Cricket Association and the Cricket Association of Bengal on the fence. As per then Saurashtra Cricket Association secretary Madhukar Worah, "the idea of having headquarters of the BCCI at places other than Mumbai was floated many times in the past. However, after detailed discussions on the subject, Mumbai was found to be most suitable."

Cricket centre is situated on the rented plot of MCA, which itself took on lease in 1968 from Government of Maharashtra for 50 years. The lease period finished in 2018. In 2019 Collector of Mumbai Shivaji Jondhale asked MCA to renew lease by paying 120 crore rupees and remaining dues or vacate the place. The land is 43,977.93 sq. meters and contains Wankhede stadium and cricket centre in it. In 1975, MCA built Wankhede stadium on the plot.

Location 
Cricket centre is situated in the premises of Wankhede Stadium and near the Mumbai Cricket Association's headquarters on Marine drive road in Churchgate. It is a western modern style building, decorated by glass windows and exterior wall tiles. MCA and BCCI headquarters are situated in the same building of Cricket centre on 3rd and 4th floor respectively, inside the 4 story building. The headquarters of Indian Premier League (IPL) are situated on the 4th floor of Cricket centre.

Cricket centre is situated on the land of MCA, which MCA itself took on lease from Government of Maharashtra for 50 years in 1968. BCCI pays rent to MCA for the land. The total area of the plot is 43977.93 sq. meters.

In popular culture 

 It was featured in M.S. Dhoni: The Untold Story (2016).

See also 

 Indian Premier League (IPL) 
 List of presidents of the Board of Control for Cricket in India
 India national cricket team 
 India women's national cricket team
 List of members of the Board of Control for Cricket in India

External links 

 BCCI's website - www.bcci.tv

References 

Cricket administration in India
Mumbai
Cricket in India
Sport in India